Seyyed Mohammad Tadayon was an Iranian politician. He held several government offices including minister of education, minister without portfolio, minister of supplies, and minister of interior. Tadayyon also served as a lawmaker and senator.

References 

1881 births
1951 deaths
Iranian educators
Speakers of the National Consultative Assembly
Revival Party politicians
Democrat Party (Persia) politicians
Academic staff of the University of Tehran
Governors of Kerman Province
People from Birjand
Government ministers of Iran
Members of the Senate of Iran
Members of the 5th Iranian Majlis
Members of the 6th Iranian Majlis
People of Qajar Iran
20th-century Iranian politicians